The  (Dutch for "Flemish National Union" or "Flemish National League"), widely known by its acronym VNV, was a Flemish nationalist political party active in Belgium between 1933 and 1945. It became the leading force of political collaboration in Flanders during the German occupation of Belgium in World War II. Authoritarian by inclination, the party advocated the creation of a "Greater Netherlands" (Dietsland) combining Flanders and the Netherlands.

Origins
The  (VNV) was founded on 8 October 1933. Its origins were in the long-established Frontpartij, a moderate Flemish patriotic party which was taken over by Staf Declercq and moved to the right in 1932. From the start, the VNV was clearly authoritarian and anti-democratic, being influenced by fascist ideas from elsewhere in Europe. However, it initially included both moderate and radical wings and was not a genuinely fascist organisation per se. Ideologically, the party rejected Belgium and supported the creation of a new polity known as the Greater Netherlands (Dietsland), through the fusion of Belgian Flanders and the Netherlands, which would be linguistically and ethnically homogeneous. The party's slogan was: "Authority, discipline, Dietsland".

It shared many ideological elements with Verdinaso, a rival party which had been founded two years earlier, but was slightly less radical. Unlike Verdinaso, the VNV took part in elections and also included a relatively moderate wing. Initially, it also differed from Verdinaso in not being an anti-Semitic movement, but it increasingly embraced anti-Semitic elements after 1935, out of political calculation rather than ideological conviction.

In the 1936 Belgian general election the VNV received 13.6% of the Flemish vote, corresponding to 7.1% nationwide. After the election, in which the far-right nationalist and Catholic Rexist Party also performed strongly, the two parties concluded an alliance, intended to create a corporatist Belgian state with great autonomy for Flanders. The VNV revoked this agreement after just one year. In the 1939 elections, the VNV moderately increased its share of the Flemish vote to 15% (8.4% nationally) while the Rexist vote collapsed.

Despite cooperating with the Flemish section of the mainstream centre-right Catholic Party on the local level, De Clercq realised that his movement would not be able to take power by democratic means. Instead, he initiated contacts with Nazi Germany, hoping that his project could be realised with German help. He contacted the Abwehr, Germany's military intelligence service, informing them that a part of the Belgian military supported his movement and could be controlled by him in case of Germany declaring war. The Belgian state security gained knowledge of these contacts and arrested some VNV supporters.

Collaboration

When Nazi Germany invaded Belgium in 1940, De Clercq immediately chose to orient the VNV towards collaborationism, despite his previous declarations that he would not do so. Adolf Hitler did not install a civilian government (as in the Netherlands), but instead installed a military administration headed by General Alexander von Falkenhausen of the Wehrmacht. This, along with the departure of Ward Hermans and René Lagrou to form the Algemeene-SS Vlaanderen, led the VNV out of focus, forcing it to intensify its collaboration in order to gain influence. Hitler and SS-leader Heinrich Himmler made profit from the situation, and increased competition between various groups by founding some more extreme collaborationist groups like the 6th SS Volunteer Sturmbrigade Langemarck and DeVlag ("German-Flemish Working Group"). Nevertheless, VNV politicians were given the mayor's office in several Flemish towns. VNV-led local administrations participated in the organisation of the deportation of Belgian Jews to Eastern Europe as part of the Holocaust in Belgium. They willingly implemented Nazi policies like the obligation of Jews to wear the yellow badge. VNV activists played a leading role in the anti-Jewish Antwerp pogrom of April 1941.

Declercq died suddenly in October 1942, and was succeeded by Hendrik Elias, a member of the more moderate side. Elias continued collaborating with the Nazis, but tried to come to terms with the military government to prevent the installation of a civilian government, which would be composed of Nazis. Elias failed, as Hitler installed the new body and declared the annexation of Flanders by Germany in 1944; seven weeks later, Belgium was liberated by the Allies. The VNV was outlawed after the liberation of Belgium. Elias fled to Germany, but was tried after the war and imprisoned until 1959.

Electoral performance

Footnotes

References

External links 
Footage of the first four VNV party congresses

Political parties established in 1933
Political parties disestablished in 1945
Fascist parties in Belgium
Flemish Movement
1933 establishments in Belgium
1945 disestablishments in Belgium
Belgian collaboration during World War II
Defunct political parties in Belgium
The Holocaust in Belgium
Fascist parties
Anti-communist parties
Banned far-right parties